Nginx (pronounced "engine x"  , stylized as NGINX) is a web server that can also be used as a reverse proxy, load balancer, mail proxy and HTTP cache.  The software was created by Igor Sysoev and publicly released in 2004. Nginx is free and open-source software, released under the terms of the 2-clause BSD license. A large fraction of web servers use Nginx, often as a load balancer.

A company of the same name was founded in 2011 to provide support and Nginx Plus paid software. In March 2019, the company was acquired by F5, Inc. for $670 million.

Popularity 
 W3Tech's web server count of all web sites ranked Nginx first with 33.6%. Apache was second at 31.4% and Cloudflare Server third at 21.6%. , Netcraft estimated that Nginx served 22.01% of the million busiest websites with Apache a little ahead at 23.04%. Cloudflare at 19.53% and Microsoft Internet Information Services at 5.78% rounded out the top four servers for the busiest websites. Some of Netcraft's other statistics show Nginx ahead of Apache.

A 2018 survey of Docker usage found that Nginx was the most commonly deployed technology in Docker containers. In OpenBSD version 5.2 (November 2012), Nginx became part of the OpenBSD base system, providing an alternative to the system's fork of Apache 1.3, which it was intended to replace, but later in version 5.6 (November 2014) it was removed in favor of OpenBSD's own httpd(8).

Features 
Nginx is easy to configure in order to serve static web content or to act as a proxy server.

Nginx can be deployed to also serve dynamic content on the network using FastCGI, SCGI handlers for scripts, WSGI application servers or Phusion Passenger modules, and it can serve as a software load balancer. 

Nginx uses an asynchronous event-driven approach, rather than threads, to handle requests. Nginx's modular event-driven architecture can provide predictable performance under high loads.

HTTP proxy and Web server features 

 Ability to handle more than 10,000 simultaneous connections with a low memory footprint (~2.5 MB per 10k inactive HTTP keep-alive connections)
 Handling of static files, index files and auto-indexing
 Reverse proxy with caching
 Load balancing with in-band health checks
 TLS/SSL with SNI and OCSP stapling support, via OpenSSL
 FastCGI, SCGI, uWSGI support with caching
 gRPC support since March 2018, version 1.13.10.
 Name- and IP address-based virtual servers
 IPv6-compatible
 WebSockets since 1.3.13, including acting as a reverse proxy and do load balancing of WebSocket applications.
 HTTP/1.1 Upgrade (101 Switching Protocols), HTTP/2 protocol support
 URL rewriting and redirection

Mail proxy features 

 TLS/SSL support
 STARTTLS support
 SMTP, POP3, and IMAP proxy
 Requires authentication using an external HTTP server or by an authentication script

Other features include upgrading executable and configuration without client connections loss, and a module-based architecture with both core and third-party module support.

The paid Plus product includes additional features such as advanced load balancing and access to an expanded suite of metrics for performance monitoring.

Nginx vs Nginx Plus 

There are two versions of Nginx: Nginx Open Source and Nginx Plus. 

Nginx Open Source is free and open-source software. 

Nginx Plus is sold as a subscription model. It offers features in addition to Nginx Open Source, such as active health checks, session persistence based on cookies, DNS-service-discovery integration, Cache Purging API, AppDynamic, Datalog, Dynatrace New Relic plug-ins, Active-Active HA with config sync, Key-Value Store, on-the-fly with zero downtime updates upstream configurations, and key‑value stores using Nginx Plus API and web application firewall (WAF) dynamic module.

Nginx in comparison to Apache 

Nginx was written with an explicit goal of outperforming the Apache web server. Out of the box, serving static files, Nginx uses much less memory than Apache, and can handle roughly four times as many requests per second. However, this performance boost comes at a cost of decreased flexibility, such as the ability to override systemwide access settings on a per-file basis (Apache accomplishes this with an .htaccess file, while Nginx has no such feature built in).

Formerly, adding third-party modules to Nginx required recompiling the application from source with the modules statically linked. This was partially overcome in version 1.9.11 in February 2016, with the addition of dynamic module loading. However, the modules still must be compiled at the same time as Nginx, and not all modules are compatible with this system; some require the older static linking process.

Nginx Unit 

Nginx Unit is an open-source web application server, released in 2017 by NGINX, Inc. to target multi-language microservices-based applications. The initial release supported applications written in Go, PHP, and Python. By version 1.11.0, the support was extended to Java, Node.js, Perl, and Ruby applications; other features include dynamic configuration, request routing, and load balancing.

History 

Igor Sysoev began development of Nginx in 2002. Originally, Nginx was developed to solve the C10k problem, and to fill the needs of multiple websites including the Rambler search engine and portal, for which it was serving 500 million requests per day by September 2008.

Nginx Inc. was founded in July 2011 by Sysoev and Maxim Konovalov to provide commercial products and support for the software.

The company's principal place of business is San Francisco, California, while legally incorporated in British Virgin Islands.

In October 2011, Nginx, Inc. raised $3 million from BV Capital, Runa Capital, and MSD Capital, Michael Dell's venture fund.

The company announced commercial support options for companies using Nginx in production. Nginx offered commercial support in February 2012, and paid Nginx Plus subscription in August 2013.Support packages focus on installation, configuration, performance improvement, etc. Support includes proactive notifications about major changes, security patches, updates and patches. Nginx, Inc. also offers consulting services to assist customers in custom configuration or adding additional features.

In October 2013, Nginx, Inc. raised a $10 million series B investment round led by New Enterprise Associates. That round included previous investors, as well as Aaron Levie, CEO and founder of Box.com. In December 2014, Nginx raised a $20 million series B1 round led by New Enterprise Associates, with participation from e.ventures (formerly BV Capital), Runa Capital, Index Ventures and Nginx's own CEO Gus Robertson.

In September 2017, Nginx announced an API management tool, NGINX Controller, which would build off of their API Gateway, NGINX Plus. In October 2017, Nginx, Inc. announced general available Nginx Amplify SaaS providing monitoring and analytics capabilities for Nginx.

In June 2018, Nginx, Inc. raised $43 million in Series C Funding in a round led by Goldman Sachs "to Accelerate Application Modernization and Digital Transformation for Enterprises".

On 11 March 2019, F5 Networks acquired Nginx, Inc. for US$670 million.

On 12 December 2019, it was reported that the Moscow offices of Nginx Inc. had been raided by police, and that Sysoev and Konovalov had been detained. The raid was conducted under a search warrant connected to a copyright claim over Nginx by Rambler—which asserts that it owns all rights to the code because it was written while Sysoev was an employee of the company. On 16 December 2019, Russian state lender Sberbank, which owns 46.5 percent of Rambler, called an extraordinary meeting of Rambler's board of directors asking Rambler's management team to request Russian law enforcement agencies cease pursuit of the criminal case, and begin talks with Nginx and with F5.

On 18 January 2022, it was announced that Igor Sysoev is leaving Nginx and F5.

See also 

 Comparison of web server software
 List of Apache–MySQL–PHP packages
 List of Nginx–MySQL–PHP packages
 Web accelerator

References

External links 

 

2002 software
Companies established in 2011
Cross-platform free software
Free proxy servers
Free software programmed in C
Free web server software
Proxy server software for Linux
Reverse proxy
Software companies of Russia
Software using the BSD license
Unix network-related software
Web server software
Web server software for Linux
Russian inventions